Pediasia dorsipunctella is a moth in the family Crambidae. It was described by William D. Kearfott in 1908. It is found in North America, where it has been recorded from Alberta, Arizona, California, Manitoba, Montana, Nevada, North Dakota and Ontario. The habitat consists of grasslands.

The wingspan is 24–28 mm. The forewing colour ranges from ochraceous fawn to dark brown. The hindwings are smoky grey to dark brown. Adults are on wing from July to August.

References

Crambini
Moths described in 1908
Moths of North America